Joseph Looby (November 24, 1917 – January 26, 2001) was an American Democratic legislator, labor union official, and factory worker.

Born in Eau Claire, Wisconsin, Looby served in the United States Army during World War II and was a Roman Catholic. He worked at the United States Rubber Company and was involved in the labor union. He served on the Eau Claire Common Council and the Eau Claire County Board of Supervisors. He also served in the Wisconsin State Assembly from 1969 to 1979 and from 1981 to 1989.

Electoral history

Wisconsin State Assembly Election, 1972:
 Joseph Looby (D) - 12,599 (59.05%)
 Dave Duax (R) - 8,730 (40.93%)

References

1917 births
2001 deaths
Catholics from Wisconsin
Politicians from Eau Claire, Wisconsin
Wisconsin city council members
County supervisors in Wisconsin
20th-century American politicians
Military personnel from Wisconsin
United States Army personnel of World War II
Democratic Party members of the Wisconsin State Assembly